Rabbi Yakov Yosef Twersky (June 23, 1899 – March 31, 1968) was the Grand Rabbi and spiritual leader of the village of New Square, New York, and of Skverer Hasidism worldwide.

Biography 
Born in Ukraine, Twersky was a Holocaust survivor. In 1950, he arrived in the United States and lived in Williamsburg, Brooklyn. In 1956, Twersky founded the first shtetl in the United States, the village of New Square in Rockland County, New York.

Family

Lineage from Ba'al Shem Tov 
 Ba'al Shem Tov
 Rabbi Tzvi
 Rabbi Aaron of Tituv
 Rabbi Tzvi of Tituv (Hershele Skverer)
 Chana Sima (married Rabbi Yitzchak Twerski of Skvira)
 Rabbi David Twersky of Skvira
 Rabbi Yakov Yosef Twersky

Lineage from Rabbi Menachem Nachum Twerski of Chernobyl 
 Rabbi Menachem Nachum Twerski of Chernobyl
 Rabbi Mordechai Twersky of Chernobyl
 Rabbi Yitzchak Twersky of Skvira
 Rabbi David Twersky of Skvira
 Rabbi Yakov Yosef Twersky

After his passing, his son Rabbi David Twersky succeeded him as the grand rabbi of the Skverer Hasidim.

Bibliography 
 Bikdusha Shel Ma'la, Biography of Rabbi Yakov Yosef (Twerski) of Skver, by Mechon Mishkenos Yakov, 2005

References 

Skver (Hasidic dynasty)
People from New Square, New York
American Hasidic rabbis
Descendants of the Baal Shem Tov
Rabbis from New York (state)
People from Williamsburg, Brooklyn
1899 births
1968 deaths
Rebbes of Skver

he:יעקב יוסף טברסקי